Pigmentiphaga daeguensis is a gram-negative, non-spore-forming, rod-shaped, non-motile bacterium from the genus Pigmentiphaga, which was isolated from wastewater of a dye works in Daegu in South Korea

References

External links
Type strain of Pigmentiphaga daeguensis at BacDive -  the Bacterial Diversity Metadatabase

Burkholderiales
Bacteria described in 2007